Westcot Camera was a priory in Oxfordshire, England.

Monasteries in Oxfordshire